The American Thyroid Association (ATA) is a professional organization of over 1700 medical specialists devoted to thyroid biology and to the prevention and treatment of thyroid disease through excellence in research, clinical care, education, and public health. The ATA publishes the journals Clinical Thyroidology for the Public and Signal.  The peer-reviewed journals Thyroid, Clinical Thyroidology and VideoEndocrinology are published through Mary Ann Liebert, Inc., publishers.

References 

 

Endocrinology organizations
Medical associations based in the United States
Medical and health organizations based in Virginia
Organizations established in 1923
1923 establishments in the United States